The Oklahoma Sooners softball program is a college softball team that represents the University of Oklahoma in the Big 12 Conference in the National Collegiate Athletic Association. The team has had 5 head coaches since it started playing organized softball in the 1975 season. The current coach is Patty Gasso, who took over the head coaching position in 1995.

Key

Coaches

Notes

References

Lists of college softball head coaches in the United States

Oklahoma Sooners softball coaches